Blue in the Sky is the fifth studio album by American country music singer Dustin Lynch. It was released on February 11, 2022, through Broken Bow Records. It was produced by Zach Crowell and preceded by the lead single "Thinking 'Bout You", a collaboration with MacKenzie Porter. The album also includes collaborations with Chris Lane and Riley Green. Lynch will tour in support of the record.

Background
Lynch released the lead single "Thinking 'Bout You" featuring MacKenzie Porter in May 2021, a song originally recorded for his previous album Tullahoma as a duet with Lauren Alaina. He followed this with two songs released digitally in July, the "mid-tempo, fiddle-led love story" "Pasadena" and "acoustic ballad" "Not Every Cowboy". In December 2021, Lynch told Taste of Country that the album was finished and had been handed over to his record label. Lynch described the album as a "collection of songs that are going to make you feel good and want to mix a drink and party with your friends".

Critical reception

Stephen Thomas Erlewine of AllMusic wrote that the album often "wanders into territory that's pretty corny, but Lynch serves up his good times with a smile, an affect that serves him equally well on breezy pop tunes and earnest ballads".

Track listing

Personnel

 Dustin Lynch – lead vocals
 MacKenzie Porter – vocals (track 2)
 Chris Lane – vocals (track 6)
 Riley Green – vocals (track 9)
 Nir Z – drums
 Aaron Sterling – drums
 Jerry Flowers – bass guitar
 Mark Hill – bass guitar
 Jimmie Lee Sloas – bass guitar
 Ilya Toshinsky – acoustic guitar
 Devin Malone – electric guitar, acoustic guitar, pedal steel guitar, dobro, banjo, mandolin
 Derek Wells – electric guitar
 Sol Philcox-Littlefield – electric guitar, acoustic guitar
 Kenny Greenberg – electric guitar
 Josh Matheny – dobro, acoustic guitar
 Justin Ebach – acoustic guitar, programming, background vocals
 Scotty Sanders – dobro, pedal steel guitar
 Jenee Fleenor – fiddle
 Will Weatherly – programming, keyboards, acoustic guitar
 Zach Crowell – producer, programming, keyboards, background vocals, percussion
 Sarah Buxton – background vocals
 Ben Caver – background vocals
 Jeff Hyde – background vocals
 Bryce Cain – digital editing
 Jim Cooley – mixing
 Zach Kuhlman – mixing assistant
 Andrew Mendelson – mastering
 Scott Johnson – production manager

Charts

Weekly charts

Year-end charts

References

2022 albums
BBR Music Group albums
Dustin Lynch albums